Les Trois-Domaines is a commune in the Meuse department in Grand Est in north-eastern France.

The commune of Les Trois-Domaines ("the three estates") was formed by the merger of the towns of Issoncourt, Mondrecourt, and Rignaucourt in 1973.

See also
Communes of the Meuse department
Gare de Meuse TGV

References

Troisdomaines